Pavel Valeryevich Sozykin (born 25 December 1987) is a Russian sailor. He and Denis Gribanov placed 13th in the men's 470 event at the 2016 Summer Olympics. Sozykin had initially been banned from the Games after his name was included in a World Anti-Doping Agency report on doping in Russia; he was cleared to participate before his event began.

References

External links
 
 
 

1987 births
Living people
Russian male sailors (sport)
Olympic sailors of Russia
Sailors at the 2016 Summer Olympics – 470
Sailors at the 2020 Summer Olympics – 470